Diamanto Koumbaki (Greek: Διαμάντω Κουμπάκη; Piraeus, 1926 – Nikaia, 1944) was a Greek partisan. A strong supporter of Communism, Koubmbaki fought against the Axis powers during World War II. She was arrested, tortured, and executed during by the German army in Nikaia, Attica in 1944. Following the war, a square in Nikaia was renamed in her honor.

References 

1926 births
1944 deaths
Greek people executed by Nazi Germany
Greek communists
People from Piraeus
Greek Resistance members
Greek torture victims
Executed communists